V 303 Tannenberg was a German fishing trawler that was requistioned in the Second World War by the Kriegsmarine for use as a vorpostenboot. She was returned to her owners post war. In 1958, she was re-engined and converted to a cargo ship. In 1970 she was sold to Greece and renamed Panaghia. She was sold to Panama in 1975 and was renamed Nikos then Chantal. She was wrecked in 1978.

Description
The engine was built by Deschimag Seebeckwerft, Wesermünde, Germany. It was rated at 92nhp.

History
Tannenberg was built at yard number 527 by Deschimag Seebeckwerft, Wesermünde for the Nordsee Deutsche Hochseefischerei AG, Cuxhaven. She was launched in May 1935 and completed in July. The fishing boat registration HC 293 was allocated, as were the Code Letters DJPI.

On 23 September 1939, Tannenberg was requistioned by the Kriegsmarine for use as a vorpostenboot. She was allocated to 3 Vorpostenflotille as V 303 Tannenburg. On 5 January 1941, she sank or was sunk. She was raised, repaired and returned to service.

Tannenberg was returned to her owners post-war. In 1948, her registration was changed to BX 541. In 1958, she was sold to E. Böse, Emden, West Germany. In that year, a diesel engine was fitted and she was converted to a cargo ship. The engine was a four stroke single acting type. It had 6 cylinders of  diameter by  stroke. She was sold to K. Kruse, Emden in 1966. In 1970, Tannenberg was sold to Greece and renamed Panaghia. She was sold to Panama in 1975 and was renamed Nikos, then Chantal later that year. She was declared a total loss.

References

Sources

External links
Colour photograph of Chantal

1935 ships
Ships built in Bremen (state)
Fishing vessels of Germany
Steamships of Germany
World War II merchant ships of Germany
Auxiliary ships of the Kriegsmarine
Maritime incidents in January 1941
Fishing vessels of West Germany
Steamships of West Germany
Fishing vessels of Greece
Merchant ships of Panama
Maritime incidents in 1978
Shipwrecks in the Caribbean Sea